Ketuyu (died 734) was a Khitan military chief, notable for his Ketuyu rebellion. Despite the presence of a khagan, he de facto controlled Khitan politics. His power made the Khitan khagan jealous, and he then defended himself by making a coup in 720, against Suogu. By this action, he incurred Tang dynasty opposition and they sent military campaigns against him, which he defeated several times. He was eventually crushed by repeated Tang campaigns, and was murdered together with Qulie by his subordinate Li Guozhe.

See also 
 Ketuyu rebellion
 List of the Khitan rulers

Sources

References 

8th-century Khitan people
Khitan people in Tang dynasty